Ten Summoner's Tales is the fourth solo studio album by English rock musician Sting. The title is a combined pun of his family name, Sumner, and a character in Geoffrey Chaucer's The Canterbury Tales, the summoner. Released in 1993, it explores themes of love and morality in a noticeably upbeat mood compared to his previous release, the introspective The Soul Cages released in 1991 after the loss of both his parents in the 1980s.

This album contains two US hits; "If I Ever Lose My Faith in You" reached No. 17 on the Billboard Hot 100 while "Fields of Gold" got to No. 23.

Ten Summoner's Tales was shortlisted for the 1993 Mercury Prize. In 1994, it was nominated for six Grammy awards including Album of the Year (losing to Whitney Houston‘s The Bodyguard), winning Best Engineered Album, Non-Classical, Best Male Pop Vocal Performance ("If I Ever Lose My Faith in You") and Best Long Form Music Video, while "If I Ever Lose My Faith in You" was also nominated for Record and Song of the Year.

A laser disc and VHS of the album were released, containing live performances of all songs on the album at Lake House.

A promotional disc was made where Sting discusses some of the songs on the album. There was also an unofficial live album produced during the Ten Summoner's Tales era, entitled Meadowlands of Gold, which contained 13 tracks performed at the Meadowlands Arena on February 26, 1994, in East Rutherford, New Jersey. The songs consisted of tracks from the album, and a few songs by The Police plus a cover of the Beatles' "A Day in the Life".

In February 2023, it was announced that Ten Summoner's Tales would be re-released and digitally expanded, with multiple songs not previously heard or available to download.

Background
The album was recorded at Lake House, Wiltshire, mixed at The Town House, London and mastered at Masterdisk, New York. The cover of the album was photographed at Wardour Old Castle in Wiltshire, featuring Hrímnir, an Icelandic horse Sting owned for a period.

A long form 'performance' video of the entire album was filmed at Sting's Lake House property. The audio used is partly from the album, but partly recorded as played by the band during the filming. This film was released in conjunction with the album. The video went on to win a Grammy Award for Best Long Form Video in 1994, and was directed by Doug Nichol and produced by Julie Fong.

On 11 August 1994, a compact disc of Ten Summoner's Tales became the first item ever securely purchased over the Internet, for $12.48 plus shipping. There was also an interview disc released for the album, in which Sting talks about all tracks on the album.

The second track on the album, "Love Is Stronger Than Justice (The Munificent Seven)", was named as a homage to the films Seven Samurai and The Magnificent Seven. According to the interview disc, the idea came to Sting when he wanted to write a song in the 7/4 time signature. The song "Seven Days" is also noted for the sophisticated playing of drummer Vinnie Colaiuta in the 5/4 time signature.

The international-exclusive track "Everybody Laughed But You" was excluded from Canadian and American pressings of the album. However, US singles from the album included the song, as well as a version of the song with different lyrics titled "January Stars".

The singles for Ten Summoner's Tales also give credit to Fernandes Guitars, as Dominic Miller played a Fernandes P-Project Acoustic Electric Nylon guitar throughout the album.

1998 re-release
Ten Summoner's Tales was remastered and re-released in 1998. The new CD issue included a bonus video track of "If I Ever Lose My Faith in You". It also featured the song "Everybody Laughed But You", which was excluded from the original 1993 release in the US and Canada. The song did appear on the original release in the UK, Europe, Japan and other territories, and on the single "If I Ever Lose My Faith in You". The instrumental track for "Everybody Laughed But You" was also used with an alternate lyric and released as "January Stars" on the singles "Seven Days" and "If I Ever Lose My Faith in You".

Track listing

Notes:

Narration on "Saint Augustine in Hell" performed by David Foxxe.
"Everybody Laughed But You" does not appear on most vinyl pressings or on the original US and Canadian versions of the album.
Pressings of the album that do not include "Everybody Laughed But You" (and so only have 11 tracks) omit "Prologue" from the title of "If I Ever Lose My Faith in You".

Personnel 
 Sting – vocals, bass guitar, double bass, harmonica, saxophone, arrangements 
 David Sancious – keyboards
 Dominic Miller – guitars
 Paul Franklin – pedal steel guitar
 Vinnie Colaiuta – drums
 Larry Adler – chromatic harmonica
 Brendan Power – chromatic harmonica
 Richard Edwards – trombone
 Mark Nightingale – trombone
 John Barclay – trumpet 
 Guy Barker – trumpet
 Dave Heath – flute
 Kathryn Tickell – Northumbrian smallpipes, fiddle
 Sian Bell – cello
 James Boyd – viola
 Simon Fischer – violin 
 Kathryn Greeley – violin
 David Foxxe – narration (devil's voice on "Saint Augustine in Hell")

Production 
 Sting – producer
 Hugh Padgham – producer, engineer, mixing 
 Andrew Bradfield – assistant engineer 
 Pete Lewis – assistant engineer 
 Simon Osborne – assistant engineer
 Roger Lian – digital editing 
 Bob Ludwig – mastering 
 Gateway Mastering (Portland, Maine, USA) – mastering location 
 Danny Quatrochi – personal technical assistant 
 Richard Frankel – art direction, design 
 Norman Moore – art direction, design 
 Kevin Westenberg – photography

Use in media

The backing track of "Shape of My Heart" was used, in a slightly altered way, by rapper Nas on his song "The Message" from his 1996 album It Was Written. In the later 1990s and the 2000s, it became a popular sample in R&B and hip hop songs, possibly inspired by Nas' usage. It has since been sampled or interpolated over 40 times, in the following list of songs:

 "Take Him Back" by Monica, from the 1998 album The Boy Is Mine
 "Release Me" by Blaque, from their 1999 self-titled album
 "Never Let Go" by Hikaru Utada, from the 1999 album First Love (re-recorded instrumental)
 "Emotional" by Carl Thomas, from the 2000 album of the same name
 "Ways of the World" by Lil' Zane, from the 2000 album Young World: The Future
 In some live renditions of the 2001 song "Je Moest Waarschijnlijk Gaan" by Brainpower
 "Rise & Fall" by Craig David, from the 2002 album Slicker Than Your Average (re-recorded instrumentals, and chorus sung - with new lyrics - by Sting)
 "Shape" by the Sugababes, from the 2002 album Angels with Dirty Faces (includes the original chorus vocals as well as the song's B-section)
 "Ways to Avoid the Sun" by Rain (2003) has a similar melody, which was probably inspired by this song.
 "I Love You" by Kim Hyung Sup (2005), from the original soundtrack of the South Korean television series Sassy Girl Chun-hyang, has a similar melody. 
 "I Crave You" by Shontelle, from the 2008 album Shontelligence
 "For My Soldiers" by Pastor Troy, from the 2008 album Attitude Adjuster (includes some of the song's original chorus)
 "Lucid Dreams" by Juice Wrld, from the 2018 album Goodbye & Good Riddance

The song "Shape of My Heart" has been covered by several artists:

 Ann-Margret, on the soundtrack to the 1996 television movie Blue Rodeo
 Lee Ritenour, featuring Steve Lukather and Andy McKee, for the 2010 album 6 String Theory
 Vybz Kartel
 Josh Groban, featuring Leslie Odom, Jr., on his 2020 album Harmony

"Shape Of My Heart" is also used as the backing music for a popular card manipulation illusion by Canadian magician and illusionist Shawn Farquhar.

The song "Fields of Gold" has also been covered by several artists:

Eva Cassidy, on her 1996 album Live at Blues Alley
Mary Black, on her 1999 album Speaking with the Angel
I Muvrini, for the English-Corsican version "Terre d'Oru", released in 2000 and featuring Sting himself
CJ Crew, on the 2002 eurodance compilation Dancemania Speed 9
Mary Wilson, on her 2007 album Up Close: Live from San Francisco
Jay and Abby Michaels – The Harper and The Minstrel (arranged for Celtic Harp and Female Vocal), from their 2008 album For A Moment
Fourplay on their 2004 album Journey
Celtic Woman soloist, Lisa Kelly, on their PBS special Songs From the Heart
Will Martin, on his 2010 album Inspirations

Soundtrack appearances
A different version of "It's Probably Me", featuring Eric Clapton, was featured in the opening titles of Lethal Weapon 3. (This version was available as a single.) The song "Shape of My Heart" was featured in the end credits of the 1994 French thriller Léon: The Professional, replacing Éric Serra's "The Experience of Love" (a track that Serra eventually used in his 1995 soundtrack for the James Bond film GoldenEye). In 2011, "Shape of My Heart" was used to conclude the final episode of the seventh series of British television drama Hustle.

Accolades

Grammy Awards

|-
| style="width:35px; text-align:center;" rowspan="6"|1994 ||rowspan=3| Ten Summoner's Tales || Album of the Year || 
|-
|Best Engineered Album, Non-Classical || 
|-
|Best Music Video, Long Form || 
|-
|rowspan=3|"If I Ever Lose My Faith in You" || Best Pop Vocal Performance, Male || 
|-
| Record of the Year || 
|-
| Song of the Year ||

Brit Awards

|-
| width="35" align="center" rowspan="3"|1994||Ten Summoner's Tales || Best British Album || 
|-
| Sting (performer) || Best British Male Artist || 
|-
| "Fields of Gold" || Best British Video ||

Mercury Prize

|-
| width="35" align="center"|1993 || Ten Summoner's Tales || Mercury Music Prize || 
|-

Charts

Weekly charts

Year-end charts

Certifications and sales

References

External links
Stingoop.com Ten Summoner's Tales Release Details
Sting.com Ten Summoner's Tales Release Details on Sting's official website

Sting (musician) albums
1993 albums
Albums produced by Hugh Padgham
A&M Records albums
Jazz fusion albums by English artists
Albums recorded in a home studio
Grammy Award for Best Engineered Album, Non-Classical